The 2004 Hawaii Warriors football team represented the University of Hawaii at Manoa in the 2004 NCAA Division I-A football season. Hawaii finished the 2004 season with an 8–5 record, going 4–4 in Western Athletic Conference (WAC) play. The Warriors made their third straight appearance in the Hawaii Bowl, facing off against the UAB Blazers. The Warriors would go on to defeat the Blazers and cap off their third straight winning season, the fifth in six seasons under head coach June Jones.
In his final season, quarterback Timmy Chang set the NCAA Division I-A all-time passing yards record with 17,072, surpassing the old mark held by BYU quarterback Ty Detmer (15,031). Chang also set records for total offensive yards (17,183), most offensive plays (2,610), and most interceptions (77). Wide receiver Chad Owens won the Mosi Tatupu Award for the best special teams player in the country and would earn second team AP All-American honors as an all purpose player.

Schedule

Statistics
 QB Timmy Chang: 358/602 (59.5%) for 4,258 yards with 38 TD vs. 13 INT. 37 carries for 15 yards and 2 TD.
 RB Michael Brewster: 113 carries for 722 yards and 6 TD. 34 catches for 273 yards and 1 TD.
 RB West Kellikipi: 72 carries for 336 yards and 7 TD. 17 catches for 131 yards and 0 TD.
 WR Chad Owens: 102 catches for 1,290 yards and 17 TD.
 WR Jason Rivers: 80 catches for 973 yards and 7 TD.
 WR Britton Komine: 53 catches for 788 yards and 4 TD.
 WR Gerald Welch: 45 catches for 515 yards and 5 TD.
 WR Se'e Poumele: 13 catches for 151 yards and 2 TD.
 WR Ross Dickerson: 15 catches for 143 yards and 1 TD.
 K Justin Ayat: 11/15 on field goals and 54/58 on extra points.

References

Hawaii
Hawaii Rainbow Warriors football seasons
Hawaii Bowl champion seasons
Hawaii Warriors football